Navjyoti School was established in 1988. It is a Catholic School under the management of the Sisters of Charity of Nazareth, an international congregation, committed to work for justice in solidarity with oppressed peoples, especially the economically poor and women, and to care for the Earth. This aim is realized through education, health services, social action and social services. The school is recognized by Nepal Government. It is owned and operated by Nepal Nazareth Society.

Years in schools
Year 0: Junior Kindergarten (JKG)
Year 1: Senior Kindergarten (SKG)
Year 2: Class I
Year 3: Class II
Year 4: Class III
Year 5: Class IV
Year 6: Class V
Year 7: Class VI
Year 8: Class VII
Year 9: Class IIX
Year 10: Class IX
Year 11: Class X

Library
The library provides study areas and housing for a collection of nearly 8000 books along with audiovisual materials. It has textbooks, journals, reference books, newspapers and magazines. The school provides audiovisual facilities to the primary students. Each class visits the library twice a week.

Laboratories
The school has laboratories for Physics, Chemistry, Biology and Computer Science.

Transport
The school has two yellow and silver school buses and one red jeep.

Sports
The school has  football and basketball teams. Other facilities include cricket, table tennis, volleyball, karate, kung fu,  badminton and tae kwon do.

Schools in Nepal
1988 establishments in Nepal